Gerd Janne Kristoffersen (born 18 November 1952 in Verdal) is a Norwegian politician for the Labour Party.

She was elected to the Norwegian Parliament from Nord-Trøndelag in 2005. She had previously served as a deputy representative during the term 2001–2005.

Kristoffersen was a member of the executive committee of Verdal municipal council from 1991 to 1995, later serving as mayor from 1999 to 2005. From 1995 to 1999 she was a member of Nord-Trøndelag county council.

Before entering politics she worked at Levanger Hospital.

References

1952 births
Living people
Labour Party (Norway) politicians
Members of the Storting
Mayors of places in Nord-Trøndelag
Nord-Trøndelag University College alumni
People from Verdal
Women members of the Storting
21st-century Norwegian politicians
21st-century Norwegian women politicians
Women mayors of places in Norway